The 2005 Utah Utes football team represented the University of Utah in the 2005 NCAA Division I-A football season. This was Kyle Whittingham's first year as head coach after having been promoted from defensive coordinator following the departure of Urban Meyer for Florida. Their 4–4 conference record put them tied for fourth in the conference. The Utes played their homes games in Rice-Eccles Stadium.

Schedule

After the season

NFL Draft
Utah had two players taken in the 2006 NFL Draft:

References

Utah
Utah Utes football seasons
Redbox Bowl champion seasons
Utah Utes football